Jaan Jaago (6 July 1887 Luunja Parish, Tartu County – 28 August 1949 Berlin) was an Estonian wrestler.

1913–1915, 1924-1926 and 1928 he won three times World Wrestling Championships.

In 1921 he moved to Germany.

He died in 1949 and in 190 his ashes were transported to Estonia and interred to Tallinn Forest Cemetery.

References

1887 births
1949 deaths
Estonian professional wrestlers
Burials at Metsakalmistu
People from Luunja Parish